Kath Soucie  is an American actress, known for playing Linka in Captain Planet and the Planeteers, Lola Bunny in the Looney Tunes franchise, Fifi La Fume and Li'l Sneezer in Tiny Toon Adventures, Minx in Jem, Bea in Mighty Max, Dexter's Mom in Dexter's Laboratory, Maddie Fenton in Danny Phantom, Phil, Lil and their mother Betty DeVille in Rugrats, Agent K in The Replacements, Princess Sally Acorn in Sonic the Hedgehog, Cadpig and Rolly in 101 Dalmatians: The Series, Kat Harvey in The Spooktacular New Adventures of Casper, Morgana Macawber in Darkwing Duck, and Kanga in the Winnie the Pooh franchise. She also voiced Tuffy Mouse in The Tom and Jerry Show, Perdita in the 101 Dalmatians franchise, since 101 Dalmatians II: Patch's London Adventure (2003), Ray Ray Lee in The Life and Times of Juniper Lee, and Kappei in Ninjala.

Life and career
Soucie was born in Cleveland, Ohio.

She first studied acting under drama teacher Manu Tupou. After attending the American Academy of Dramatic Arts, she began a successful career on the New York stage.

In the late 1970s, Soucie appeared in several television "movies of the week", including The Incredible Journey of Doctor Meg Laurel. However, she soon experienced disappointment with the physical restrictions of on-camera acting. In 1986 came her first voice-over job, for three different girls on Rambo: The Force of Freedom. Having started her voice acting career, the following year, Soucie played Janine Melnitz on The Real Ghostbusters, taking over the role from Laura Summer.

Soucie also voiced Jek Lawquane in Star Wars: The Bad Batch.

Filmography

Feature films

Television films

Direct-to-video films

Live-action television

Animated television

Video games

References

External links

Living people
Actresses from Cleveland
Actresses from Los Angeles
American Academy of Dramatic Arts alumni
American stage actresses
American video game actresses
American voice actresses
Audiobook narrators
Disney people
Hanna-Barbera people
20th-century American actresses
21st-century American actresses
Year of birth missing (living people)